Gail Jones (born 1955) is an Australian novelist and academic.

Early life and career
Gail Jones was born in Harvey, Western Australia. She grew up in Broome and Kalgoorlie. She studied fine arts briefly at the University of Melbourne before returning to Western Australia where she took her undergraduate degree and PhD from the University of Western Australia in 1994. Her thesis was on Mimesis and alterity : postcolonialism, ethnography and the representation of racial òthers'. She is currently Professor of Writing in the Writing and Society Research School at the Western Sydney University.

Jones has also contributed content for an art exhibition, The floating world by Jo Darbyshire (2009).

Since 2017 Jones has been involved in a research project Other Worlds: Forms of 'World Literature', for which she is leading a theme titled 'Form as Encounter' that is exploring intercultural intersections and encounters.

Published works

Novels 
Black Mirror (2002)
Sixty Lights (2004)
Dreams of Speaking (2006)
Sorry (2007)
Five Bells (2011)
A Guide to Berlin (2015)
The Death of Noah Glass (2018)
Our Shadows (2020)

Short story collections 
The House of Breathing (1992)
Fetish Lives (1997)

Critical works 
 Dorothy Green Memorial Lecture Gail Jones, 'A Dreaming, a Sauntering: re-imagining critical paradigms' JASAL 5 (2006)
The Piano (Australian Screen Classics), Currency Press (2007)

These works have been widely translated. The languages include Italian, German, French, Dutch, Portuguese, Spanish, Hebrew, Mandarin, Polish, Croatian and Czech.

Awards 

The House of Breathing
 Western Australian Premier's Book Awards, Fiction winner 1993
 FAW Barbara Ramsden Award Book of the Year, 1992
 T. A. G. Hungerford Award for an unpublished work of Fiction by a Western Australian Writer, 1991

Steele Rudd Award 1993

Fetish Lives
 Western Australian Premier's Book Awards, Fiction joint-winner and Premier's Prize joint-winner 1997

Black Mirror
 Nita Kibble Literary Award, 2003
 Western Australian Premier's Book Awards, Fiction winner 2002
Shortlisted Age Book of the Year Award 2003
Shortlisted Brisbane Courier Mail Book of the Year 2003
Longlist International Dublin Literary Award 2003

Sixty Lights
 Western Australian Premier's Book Awards, Fiction winner and Premier's Prize 2004
 South Australian Premier's Awards, winner, 2006
 ALS Gold Medal, 2005
 The Age Book of the Year Fiction Award, winner, 2005
 Shortlist Miles Franklin Award 2005
 Shortlist Commonwealth Writers Award Pacific Region 2005
 Shortlist NSW Premier's Fiction Award 2005
 Shortlist Victorian Premier's Fiction Award 2005
 Longlist International Dublin Literary Award 2006
 Longlist Booker Prize (2004)

Dreams of Speaking
 Longlisted for Orange Prize (UK) 2006
 Shortlisted for Queensland Premiers' Prize 2006
 Shortlisted for Miles Franklin Award, 2007
 Shortlisted for NSW Premier's Prize 2007
 Shortlisted for Brisbane Courier Mail Book of the Year 2007
 Shortlisted for the International Dublin Literary Award, 2008

Sorry
 Shortlisted for Miles Franklin Award, 2008
 Shortlisted for Prime Minister's Literary Awards, 2008
Shortlisted for Nita Kibble Award 2008
Shortlisted for SA Premiers Fiction Prize 2008
Shortlisted for Victorian Premier's Award 2008
Longlisted for Orange Prize (UK) 2008
Shortlisted for Prix Femina Etranger (France) 2008

Five Bells
Nita Kibble Literary Award, winner, 2012
People's Choice Award, NSW Premier's Literary Awards, winner, 2012
Longlisted for Miles Franklin Award, 2012

A Guide to Berlin
Colin Roderick Award, Winner, 2015
 Shortlisted for NSW Premier's Literary Awards, 2015
 Longlisted for the Stella Prize, 2016

The Death of Noah Glass
 Shortlisted for the Victorian Premier's Prize for Fiction, 2019
 Longlisted for the ALS Gold Medal, 2019
 Shortlisted for the Miles Franklin Award, 2019
 Prime Minister's Literary Awards, Fiction winner, 2019
 Shortlisted for the Voss Literary Prize, 2019
Adelaide Festival Awards for Literature, 2020, Fiction Award
Our Shadows

Shortlisted for the Victorian Premier's Prize for Fiction, 2021
Longlisted for the Miles Franklin Award, 2021
Shortlisted for the Voss Literary Prize, 2021

Personal life 
Jones has a daughter, Kyra Giorgi, who is also a writer.

References

External links
 Gail Jones at Random House Australia
 Knowledge (A machine-readable transcription) (1992) University of Western Australia Library, File ID: jones001
 Perth International Arts Festival 50 State Library of Western Australia (Retrieved 11 August 2007)
 Lyn Jacobs 'Gail Jones' "light writing": Memory and the Photo-graph' JASAL 5 (2006)
 Paul Genoni 'Art is the Windowpane' : Novels of Australian Women and Modernism in Inter-war Europe' JASAL 3 (2004)
 Tanya Dalziell 'An Ethics of Mourning: Gail Jones's Black Mirror ' JASAL 4 (2005)
 Robert Dixon 'Ghosts in the Machine: Modernity and the Unmodern in Gail Jones's Dreams of Speaking ' JASAL 8 (2008)

1955 births
21st-century Australian novelists
Australian women short story writers
Australian women novelists
Living people
People from Harvey, Western Australia
Writers from Western Australia
Academic staff of Western Sydney University
ALS Gold Medal winners
21st-century Australian women writers
21st-century Australian short story writers
University of Western Australia alumni